Cape Codder can denote:

A resident or native of Cape Cod
The Cape Codder (train), a former Amtrak train
The Cape Codder (NH train), a former New York, New Haven and Hartford Railroad train
Cape Codder (cocktail), a cocktail
The Cape Codders, a former hockey team

See also
Cape Cod (disambiguation)